The WebMuseum, formerly known as the WebLouvre, was founded by Nicolas Pioch in France in 1994, while he was a student. It is one of the earliest examples of a virtual museum.

The site won the 1994 Best of the Web award for the "Best Use of Multiple Media".

When the actual Louvre became aware of the original WebLouvre's existence, it was forced to change its name to the WebMuseum. However, many mirror sites were established throughout the world (including websites located in Brazil, Hungary, Japan, Mexico, Norway, Poland, Russia, UK and the United States), making it impossible to eradicate it entirely. It still provides a resource of high resolution art images and information, although it is no longer actively updated.

Although this virtual museum is French in origin, it is available in English.

See also
 The Artchive
 Web Gallery of Art
 Virtual Library museums pages

References

External links
WebMuseum website

Internet properties established in 1994
1994 establishments in France
Virtual art museums and galleries
Louvre
1994 in art